Aproaerema is a genus of moths in the family Gelechiidae.

Species
Aproaerema africanella (Janse, 1951)
Aproaerema anthyllidella (Hübner, 1813)
Aproaerema brevihamata Li, 1993
Aproaerema coracina (Meyrick, 1921)
Aproaerema isoscelixantha (Lower, 1897)
Aproaerema lerauti Vives, 2001
Aproaerema longihamata Li, 1993
Aproaerema mercedella Walsingham, 1908
Aproaerema modicella (Deventer, 1904)
Aproaerema simplexella (Walker, 1864)

References

External links
Images representing Aproaerema at Consortium for the Barcode of Life

 
Anacampsini
Moth genera